Pârâul Tulbure may refer to:

 Pârâul Tulbure, a tributary of the Asău in Bacău County
 Pârâul Tulbure (Șoimu)